Halakusugal is a village in Dharwad district of Karnataka, India.

Demographics 
As of the 2011 Census of India there were 749 households in Halakusugal and a total population of 4,147 consisting of 2,166 males and 1,981 females. There were 515 children ages 0-6.

References

Villages in Dharwad district